Winslow School District No. 20 was a school district headquartered in Winslow, Arkansas. The mascot was the squirrel.

On July 1, 2004, it merged into the Greenland School District.

References

External links
 
 "Winslow School District No. 20 Washington County, Arkansas General Purpose Financial Statements and Other Reports June 30, 2000."

2004 disestablishments in Arkansas
School districts disestablished in 2004
Defunct school districts in Arkansas
Education in Washington County, Arkansas